This is a list of mayors of the city of Köniz, Switzerland.

Koniz
 
Köniz